

Crown
Head of State - Queen Elizabeth II

Federal government
Governor General - Edward Schreyer

Cabinet
Prime Minister - Joe Clark then Pierre Trudeau
Deputy Prime Minister - Vacant then Allan MacEachen
Minister of Finance - John Crosbie then Allan MacEachen
Secretary of State for External Affairs - Flora McDonald then Mark MacGuigan
Secretary of State for Canada - David MacDonald then Francis Fox
Minister of the Environment - John Allen Fraser then John Roberts
Minister of Justice - Jacques Flynn then Jean Chrétien
Minister of National Defence - Allan McKinnon then Gilles Lamontagne
Minister of Health and Welfare - David Edward Crombie then Monique Bégin
Minister of Regional Economic Expansion - Elmer MacKay then Pierre De Bané
Minister of Transport - Don Mazankowski then Jean-Luc Pépin
Minister of Communications - David MacDonald then Francis Fox
Minister of Fisheries and Oceans - James McGrath then Roméo LeBlanc 
Minister of Public Works - Erik Nielsen then Paul James Cosgrove
Minister of Employment and Immigration - Ron Atkey then Lloyd Axworthy
Minister of Indian Affairs and Northern Development - Jake Epp then John Munro
Minister of Energy, Mines and Resources - Ramon John Hnatyshyn then Marc Lalonde

Parliament

Party leaders
Liberal Party of Canada - Pierre Trudeau
New Democratic Party- Ed Broadbent
Progressive Conservative Party - Joe Clark

Supreme Court Justices
Chief Justice: Bora Laskin
William McIntyre
Ronald Martland
Antonio Lamer
Roland Almon Ritchie
Willard Estey
Jean Beetz
Julien Chouinard
Gerald Eric Le Dain

Other
Speaker of the House of Commons - James Jerome
Governor of the Bank of Canada - Gerald Bouey
Chief of the Defence Staff - Air General Robert Hilborn Falls

Provinces

Premiers
Premier of Alberta - Peter Lougheed
Premier of British Columbia - Bill Bennett
Premier of Manitoba - Sterling Lyon
Premier of New Brunswick - Richard Hatfield
Premier of Newfoundland - Brian Peckford
Premier of Nova Scotia - John Buchanan
Premier of Ontario - Bill Davis
Premier of Prince Edward Island - Angus MacLean
Premier of Quebec - René Lévesque
Premier of Saskatchewan - Allan Blakeney

Lieutenant-governors
Lieutenant-Governor of Alberta - Frank C. Lynch-Staunton
Lieutenant-Governor of British Columbia - Henry Pybus Bell-Irving
Lieutenant-Governor of Manitoba - Pearl McGonigal
Lieutenant-Governor of New Brunswick - George F.G. Stanley
Lieutenant-Governor of Newfoundland and Labrador - William Anthony Paddon
Lieutenant-Governor of Nova Scotia - John Elvin Shaffner
Lieutenant-Governor of Ontario - Jean-Pierre Côté
Lieutenant-Governor of Prince Edward Island - Joseph Aubin Doiron
Lieutenant-Governor of Quebec - Gilles Lamontagne
Lieutenant-Governor of Saskatchewan - Irwin McIntosh

See also

1979 Canadian incumbents
Events in Canada in 1980
1981 Canadian incumbents
 Governmental leaders in 1980
 Canadian incumbents by year

1980
Incumbents
Canadian leaders